Eniac Ventures is an American seed-stage investment firm. The name stands for Electronic Numerical Integrator And Computer, which was the name of the first electric general purpose computer.

Overview
Eniac Ventures was formed in 2009 as a seed-stage investment firm.

The founding general partners of Eniac include Hadley Harris, Nihal Mehta, Tim Young, and Vic Singh. It now has offices in San Francisco and New York. Its first fund was closed in 2010 at $1.6 million, consisting of the founders’ own funds and funds from friends and family. They made investments in 32 initial companies, and developed a reputation for accelerating companies from the seed stage to Series A funding stage. Eniac's second was closed in 2013 at $12.9 million. In 2015 the firm closed its third round of funding at $55 million. In 2017 the firm closed a fourth round of funding at $100 million.

Portfolio
Early investments the company made included Airbnb, Twitter, SoundCloud, Glide, and Vimeo.
Companies that Eniac has more recently invested in include Ready Robotics, Legit, 10% Happier, Pienso, Snips, Bleximo, Iron Ox, Xwing, FortressIQ, Zero, Fuzzy, Visual Vocal, and Sea Machines.

In 2019 so far, Eniac has invested in 1upHealth  and briq

References

2009 establishments in California